Ricula is a genus of moths belonging to the family Tortricidae.

Species
Ricula dubitana Kuznetzov, 1992
Ricula maculana (Fernald, 1901)

See also
List of Tortricidae genera

References

External links
Tortricid.net

Tortricidae genera
Olethreutinae